Reversine, or 2-(4-morpholinoanilino)-6-cyclohexylaminopurine, is a small molecule developed by the group of Peter G. Schultz, used for stem cell dedifferentiation.

It also has the potential to selectively induce cell death in cancer cells.

Reversine is known to act as an antagonist of the adenosine A3 receptor. Reversine is a potent inhibitor of the mitotic kinase Mps1 and it is widely used to study the process of chromosome segregation.

References

External links
 

Adenosine receptor antagonists
Purines
Aromatic amines
4-Morpholinyl compunds
Anilines